Jeramey Anderson (born December 6, 1991) is an American politician serving as a member of the Mississippi House of Representatives from the 110th district. Upon election in 2013, Anderson became the youngest African-American candidate to be elected to any legislature in the United States.

Early life and education
Born in Pascagoula, Mississippi, Anderson graduated from Moss Point High School. He earned an associate degree in criminal justice from Pearl River Community College, attending on a soccer scholarship. He then went on to Tulane University, where he completed his bachelor's degree in homeland security.

Career 
When he was 16, he founded the nonprofit Purple Knights of America, an organization created to mentor males ages 11 through 18. Anderson is also the founder and CEO of NexiWorks, a digital marketing agency based in Mississippi.

Mississippi House of Representatives 
After finishing first in a special election on November 5, 2013, he ran against the former mayor of Moss Point (Aneice Liddell) in a runoff election to replace then-Representative Billy Bromfield, who vacated his House seat after winning the election mayor of Moss Point. Both Anderson and Liddell ran as independents. He was sworn in on his 22nd birthday. Anderson has spoken at several high school and college commencements across the country, and was recognized as a “Young Riser” at the 2015 BET Honors by BET.

Running as a Democrat, Anderson was reelected in 2015. In 2017, he filed for the 4th Congressional District and won the Democratic primary. He faced four-term incumbent Republican Steven Palazzo and Reform Party candidate Lajena Sheets in the general election in November 2018.

Anderson announced on November 11, 2020 that he would be running for mayor of Moss Point in the 2021 elections.

In his first term, Anderson sponsored numerous bills that were signed by the governor. These included forming a Commission Against Interpersonal Violence within the state health department, one granting increases in Homestead Property Tax Exemption for disabled veterans, and extending those exemptions to the unmarried surviving spouse of such veterans, and one mandating authorized insurers to provide policy and premium information to the Department of Insurance. In 2017, Anderson led efforts to thoroughly vet the state education budget formula.

Elections

2013 Mississippi House of Representatives special election
In the special election for the House seat left vacant by the departure of Billy Bromfield, Anderson beat Aneice Liddell in the runoff by 59% TO 41%.

2017 Mississippi House of Representatives election
In November 2017, Anderson announced that he would seek the Democratic nomination for Mississippi's 4th Congressional District in 2018.

2018 U.S. House of Representatives campaign

In June 2018, Anderson won the Democratic primary for Mississippi's 4th congressional district without opposition.

Anderson finished second to Steven Palazzo in the general election, on November 6, 2018, with 152,633 (68.2% of votes) for Palazzo to 68.787 (30.7%) for Anderson, and 2,312 (1.0%) for Lajena Sheets of the Reform Party.

References

External links
Jeramey for Congress
Office of Representative Jeramey Anderson

1991 births
Living people
21st-century American politicians
African-American state legislators in Mississippi
Democratic Party members of the Mississippi House of Representatives
Candidates in the 2018 United States elections
21st-century African-American politicians